In Control, Volume 1 is the debut studio album by American hip hop record producer Marley Marl of the Juice Crew. It was released on September 20, 1988 through Cold Chillin' Records with distribution via Warner Bros. Records.

The album compiles ten studio recordings by fellow Juice Crew members and artists affiliated with Marley Marl. It showcased his style of hip hop production and sampling at a time when he became one of the first super-producers in hip hop music. The album is broken down track-by-track by Marley Marl in Brian Coleman's book Check the Technique.

The opulent cover stood in contrast to Marley Marl's real living conditions: "I was still living in the projects. I was paying like $110 a month for my rent, free electricity. So New York City Housing Authority kind of co-produced some of my earlier hits".

Track listing

Personnel
Marlon "Marley Marl" Williams – main artist, producer, mixing
Craig "Craig G" Curry – featured artist (tracks: 1, 5, 7)
Marcel "Biz Markie" Hall – featured artist (track 2)
Dwight "Heavy D" Myers – featured artist (track 2)
Percy "Tragedy Khadafi" Chapman – featured artist (tracks: 3, 6)
Duval "Masta Ace" Clear – featured artist (tracks: 4, 5, 8)
Action – featured artist (tracks: 4, 8)
Nathaniel "Kool G Rap" Wilson – featured artist (track 5)
Antonio "Big Daddy Kane" Hardy – featured artist (track 5)
Shawn "MC Shan" Moltke – featured artist (track 9)
Lolita "Roxanne Shanté" Gooden – featured artist (track 10)
George DuBose – photography
James Colosimo – logo design

Charts

References

External links

1988 debut albums
Marley Marl albums
Warner Records albums
Cold Chillin' Records albums
Albums produced by Marley Marl